Susan Cummings may refer to:
Susan Cummings (heiress) (born 1962), American heiress
Susan Cummings (actress) (1930–2016), German-born US film and television actress